Cedar Stars Rush are an American soccer club competing in the USL League Two. They are owned by Cedar Stars Academy which has numerous branches in the Tri-State area with the two primary locations being in Bergen County, NJ (Boys U8–U19/Girls U8–U19) and Monmouth County, NJ (Boys U8–U19/ Girls U13–U19). They are an official member club of the MLS Next which is a youth soccer league in the United States and Canada, that is managed, organized and controlled by Major League Soccer. They are also owned by Rush Soccer, who also back three other USL2 sides – Colorado Rush SC, Daytona Rush SC, Virginia Beach United.

Players and staff

Current roster

Staff

Year-by-year

References

USL League Two teams
2018 establishments in New Jersey
Association football clubs established in 2018
Soccer clubs in New Jersey
Sports in Bergen County, New Jersey